Netaji Metro Station is a station of the Kolkata Metro. This station is situated opposite to the Kudghat bus stand at Kudghat,  in Tollygunge.

History

Early attempts 
In the September 1919 session of the Imperial Legislative Council at Shimla, a committee was set up by W. E. Crum that recommended a metro line for Kolkata (formerly Calcutta). This line was supposed to connect Bagmari in the east to Benaras Road, Salkia, in Howrah in the west via a tunnel beneath Hooghly River. The estimated construction costs were £3,526,154, about  based on current exchange rates, and the proposed deadline was 1925–1926. The tickets were priced at 3 annas (Rs. 0.1875) for the full trip. Crum also mentioned a north–south corridor back then. An east–west metro railway connection, named the "East–West Tube Railway", was proposed for Kolkata in 1921 by Harley Dalrymple-Hay. All the reports can be found in his 1921 book Calcutta Tube Railways. However, in 1923, the proposal was not undertaken due to a lack of funds.

Planning 
The then Chief Minister of West Bengal, Bidhan Chandra Roy, reconceived the idea of an underground railway for Kolkata in the early 1949–1950. A survey was done by a team of French experts, but nothing concrete came of this. Efforts to solve problem traffic by augmenting the existing fleet of public transport vehicles hardly helped, since roads accounted for only 4.2 percent of the surface area in Kolkata, compared with 25 percent in Delhi and 30 percent in other cities. To find alternative solutions, the Metropolitan Transport Project (MTP) was set up in 1969. However, only three were selected for construction. These were:

 Dum Dum – Tollygunge (Line 1. Presently operates from  Dakshineswar to New Garia)
 Bidhannagar – Ramrajatala (Line 2. Presently truncated till Howrah Maidan)
 Dakshineswar – Thakurpukur (Divided into Line 1; Noapara to Dakshineswar and Line 3; Joka to Esplanade)

A tentative deadline was fixed to complete all the corridors by 1991.

Construction 

Since it was India's first metro and was constructed as a completely indigenous process, a traditional cut-and-cover method and driven shield tunneling was chosen and the Kolkata Metro was more of a trial-and-error affair, in contrast to the Delhi Metro, which saw the involvement of multiple international consultants. As a result, it took nearly 23 years to completely construct the  underground railway.

The foundation stone of the project was laid by Indira Gandhi, the Prime Minister of India, on 29 December 1972, and construction work started in 1973–74. Initially, cut and cover along with slurry wall construction to handle soft ground, was recommended by the Soviet Union Consultants. Later, in 1977, it was decided to adopt both shield tunneling and cut and cover methods for construction under populated areas, sewer lines, water mains, electrical cables, telephone cables, tram lines, canals etc. The technology was provided by M/s NIKEX Hungarian Co., Budapest. In the early days, the project was led by the Union Railway Minister from West Bengal, A. B. A. Ghani Khan Choudhury, often against the prevailing socio-political stance of his contemporaries in the West Bengal government. From the start of construction, the project had to contend with several problems including insufficient funds (until 1977–1978), a shifting of underground utilities, court injunctions, and an irregular supply of vital materials. In 1977, an injunction for the allocation of new funding was passed by the newly elected Jyoti Basu government.

The first metro was driven by Tapan Kumar Nath and Sanjoy Kumar Sil. The service was quickly followed by commuter services on another  stretch in the north between Dum Dum and Belgachhia on 12 November 1984. However, the services on the north section were suspended starting 26 October 1992, as this small, isolated section was little used. The Line 1 was almost entirely built by cut and cover method, while a small 1.09 km stretch between Belgachia and Shyambazar was built using shield tunneling with compressed air and air locks, since the alignment crossed a railway yard (now Kolkata railway station) and Circular Canal.

After more than eight years, the  Belgachhia–Shyambazaar section, along with the Dum Dum–Belgachhia stretch, was opened on 13 August 1994. Another  stretch from Esplanade to Chandni Chowk was commissioned shortly afterwards, on 2 October 1994. The Shyambazaar-Shobhabazar–Girish Park and Chandni Chowk–Central sections were opened on 19 February 1995. Services on the entire stretch of the Metro were introduced from 27 September 1995 by bridging the  gap with Mahatma Gandhi Road metro station in the middle.

The section was constructed and opened in two phases, Mahanayak Uttam Kumar to Kavi Nazrul in 2009 and Kavi Nazrul to Kavi Subhash in 2010. The latest extension opened was the  stretch from Dum Dum to Noapara on 10 July 2013.

In February 2021 this stretch was further expanded till Dakshineswar from Noapara (4.1 km) and was inaugurated on 22 February and opened for commercial use from 23 February for general public.

The station

Structure
Netaji elevated metro station is situated on the Kolkata Metro Line 1 of Kolkata Metro.

Station layout

Connections

Bus
Kudghat Bus stand is serving near Netaji metro station. Bus route number 218, S17A, S2, V1, AC47, AC17B, SBSTC kudghat to tarapith, SBSTC kudghat to Jhargram, SBSTC kudghat to Digha, etc. are serving near the station

See also

Kolkata
List of Kolkata Metro stations
Transport in Kolkata
Kolkata Metro Rail Corporation
Kolkata Suburban Railway
Kolkata Monorail
Trams in Kolkata
Garia
Tollygunge
E.M. Bypass
List of rapid transit systems
List of metro systems

References

External links

 
 Official Website for line 1
 UrbanRail.Net – descriptions of all metro systems in the world, each with a schematic map showing all stations.

Kolkata Metro stations
Railway stations opened in 2009
Railway stations in Kolkata
Subhas Chandra Bose
Memorials to Subhas Chandra Bose